Cilovxanlı (also, Cülovxanlı) is a village and municipality in the Zardab Rayon of Azerbaijan.  It has a population of 215.

References 

Populated places in Zardab District